Migros Ticaret A.Ş. is one of the biggest chains of supermarkets in Turkey.

Together via Migros supermarkets, Macrocenter Stores, international Ramstore shopping centers, online and mobile shopping, wholesale stores, and mobile sales units, Migros Turkey serves an estimated 160 million customers. As of Nov 2014, the company operates a total of 1,156 stores: 852 Migros stores, 212 Tansaş stores, 24 5M stores and 27 Macro Centers stores in Turkey, 41 Ramstores in Kazakhstan and North Macedonia, according to its web site.

News reports in February 2008 indicated that BC Partners has agreed to buy Migros Türk in Turkey's biggest-ever leveraged buyout.    The London-based firm will trade Koc Holding 1.98 billion TL for a 51 percent stake in Migros Türk. Later BC increased its stake to 98 per cent. In 2011, the group sold approximately 20% back to public market investors. BC Partners revealed in January 2015 that it would sell its 40.25 percent stake in its supermarket chain Migros to the Turkish conglomerate Anadolu Group for around $2.74 billion.

The Migros logo

The logo of Migros Turkey is similar to an older version of the Swiss Migros logo but uses a dotted i, as the dotless I represents a different letter in the Turkish alphabet with phonetic value , a close back unrounded vowel. As in Switzerland, the supermarkets are categorized in three size classes of M, MM and MMM but with another size 5M:

 M Migros supermarkets are selling basic groceries and a limited number of non-food products
 MM Migros stores offer a wider range of non-food articles besides the basic groceries
 MMM Migros stores have a larger product spectrum ranging from stationery to textile products, electric household appliances to bakeries, books and cosmetics
 Additionally there is a fourth class, the 5M Migros have the widest product selection and are found mostly in the Anatolian Tigers or tourist areas of the southwest coast, as well as in Ankara.
 Additionally there is a fifth class, the Migros jet, mini-markets in boroughs, formed by acquisition of Tansaş resembling its Mini Tansaş line.

Migros sells some products under its own label.

History

The Mayor of Istanbul Fahrettin Kerim Gökay, together with the Foreign Minister   approached the founder of the Swiss Migros, Gottlieb Duttweiler in 1953, in order to organize a sustainable food supply to the major population centers of Turkey. Migros Turkey was established in 1954 as a joint venture with Swiss Migros Cooperatives Union. Duttweiler and Charles Henri Hochstrasser, the first head of Migros Türk also held considerable percentages. Initially, Migros Turkey operated via sales trucks (like its Swiss counterpart) only later to open stores fronts – the first in 1957 at the fish-market in Beyoğlu, Istanbul. 

In 1975, the uç Group took control of the company by acquiring a majority of its shares. Thereafter, Migros rapidly increased the number of stores in Istanbul, establishing the necessary infrastructure for purchasing fruits and vegetables directly from producers and farmers.

In 1981, a central perishables' warehouse was opened. It is still in use, with some alterations and improvements.

In 1988, following development in Istanbul, 4 large stores were opened in İzmir, and infrastructure investment were started in the Aegean region.

In addition to neighborhood stores in Istanbul and İzmir, larger stores were opened in new residential and suburban areas – an MM market in İzmir, followed by two MMM stores in Istanbul, in 1991.  	 	
	 	
Since late 1990, almost all of the older stores have been renovated, equipped with fully automated systems, introducing computerized and automatic cash registers.

In 1991, Migros became a publicly traded company.

Around this time, Migros extended its chain of supermarkets to other large cities, such as Antalya, Ankara and Bursa, and the resorts destinations of Marmaris, Bodrum, Silivri and Yalova.
	 	
In 1992, payment with credit card and customer satisfaction questionnaires were introduced.

On its 40th anniversary, the company expanded in Ankara with two more stores and in Adana and Mersin. In 1994, Migros was named "the most successful company in Turkey" and was also shown as one of the most successful companies in Europe by the Euromoney magazine.  1995 brought a rapid growth to Migros with the opening of stores in 17 provinces, including Southeastern Anatolia and Adana, Gaziantep, Edirne, Tekirdağ and Eskişehir. 	
		
In 1995, Migros introduced a low-cost brand outlet named Şok. Started in Istanbul, the discount markets expanded to Ankara and İzmir. Şoks offer both food and non-food items.

Rapid growth
In 1996, Migros Turkey introduced nearly a new store every week, establishing 51 new stores. A supermarket was opened in Erzurum, and by the end of the year, 75 million people were being served by 124 stores in 20 cities and six regions of Turkey.

In 1997, it increased the number of stores in Turkey to 169, serving 125 million customers. As in previous years, it opened 50 new stores and shopping centers in 1998 and expanded its service to 27 cities in total.  Throughout 1999, its growth rate reached two stores per week on average, adding 108 new stores and two shopping centers.

In 1996, Migros opened its first store outside of Turkey – a Ramstore in Baku, Azerbaijan – followed up the next year with a shopping center in Moscow, Russia. With the success of the first Ramstore in Baku, four new stores were opened in Azerbaijan.

Migros opened a second, larger, Ramstore shopping center in Moscow's Maryina Roscha district. In 1998, a new Ramstore shopping center's foundation was laid in Kazakhstan.

At that time, there are three Ramstores in Baku, 8 Ramstore shopping centers in Moscow, 41 Ramstores in other cities of Russia, one Ramstore shopping center in Kazakhstan, 1 Ramstore in Astana, 4 in Almaty, 1 Ramstore shopping center and hypermarket in Skopje, North Macedonia, totalling over 50 Ramstores internationally.

"Self-service checkouts" were introduced to Turkish consumers in the giant store in Ankara for the first time in Turkey and in Europe.

By the end of 1999, the number of Migros Club Cards had reached 2.5 million.

Also in 1999, Migros Turkey launched its online presence, Kangurum, hosting more than 25,000 products from 60 different stores, ranging from refrigerators, wedding rings, toys, bouquet arrangements, and tomatoes to vacation reservations.
 	 	
Migros presented the Bakkalım (literally: My Grocery) store format in the first quarter of 2000, spreading in Istanbul, İzmir and Ankara; they number 700, today. 	 	

Throughout 2001, Migros Online added Antalya and Adana to its service area. In 2001, Kangurum introduced wholesale market service, with B2B providing corporate transactions.

Within the course of 2001, Migros Türk introduced three Migros stores in MMM format, 5 Migros stores in MM format and 3 Migros stores in M format, as well as 19 Şok discount stores, one Ramstore Shopping Center and 2 Ramstores in Moscow, 1 Ramstore in Sofia, and 1 Migros Shopping Center in Antalya. By the end of 2001, Migros was operating 461 stores, serving 160 million customers annually.

Throughout 2002, Migros made 41 new investments – 1 MMM, 5 MM, 4 M and a total 23 Şok stores in Turkey, 6 new stores in Russia, 1 in Bulgaria and 1 in Azerbaijan. With the addition of these new investments, Migros reached 425 points of sale at the end of year 2002, consisting of 65 M stores, 58 MM stores, 30 MMM stores and 3 shopping centers and hypermarkets. 3 Ramstores in Baku, 15 Ramstores in Moscow, 3 Ramstores in Kazakhstan, 2 Ramstores in Sofia.

The Ramstore in Baku, destroyed after a fire in 2001, was replaced. Within 6 months, Ramstore Hatai opened its doors again – with an investment of $4.5 million.

In 2003, Migros opened its first retail store with direct access to subway in Metrocity, a shopping mall in the Levent district of Istanbul.

There are currently approximately 7 million customers holding Migros Club Cards.

In 2006, а Ramstore was opened in Bishkek, Kyrgyzstan through a Kazakh subsidiary.

It is reported that Migros Turk's market share was 8.6 percent at the end of 2006, compared with 5.3 percent for its second place competitor.

Ramstores in Sofia, Bulgaria were closed down in 2007.

In September 2007, Migros sold its 50% interest in Ramenka, which operated 53 Ramstores in Russia and other Eastern European countries, for US$542.5m to its venture partner: Enka Holdings (Enka Insaat Sanayi AS). In 2006, that operation accounted for about a fifth of Migros's revenue of US$3.3 billion.

In February 2008, BC Partners Ltd. agreed to acquire Migros Türk TAS, Turkey's largest supermarket chain, for about US$3.2 billion in the country's biggest-ever leveraged buyout, gaining 961 stores in Turkey and nearby countries through the acquisition. In 2009 Migros Türk issued an Initial Public Offering (IPO) at the Istanbul stock exchange.

In 2011 the company sold its stores in Azerbaijan, contracting its international footprint to just two countries outside of Turkey.

As of 2019, Migros Ticaret A.Ş. has 2008 Migros stores in 81 provinces of Turkey, 51 Macrocenter stores in 6 provinces, 44 Ramstore stores in Kazakhstan and North Macedonia.

See also 
Migros
Ramstore

References

External links

 Migros Ticaret
 Money Club in Turkish
 Ramstore Macedonia
 Ramstore Kazakhstan

Retail companies established in 1954
Supermarkets of Turkey
Companies based in Istanbul
Companies listed on the Istanbul Stock Exchange
1954 establishments in Turkey